The K-8 class was a minesweeper first manufactured by Poland for the Soviet Navy in 1954.

Operational history
Those minesweepers replaced a variety of minesweepers that had been used during World War II. This gave the navy an inexpensive ship to clear mines from its harbors in case of a war with NATO and the West. A wooden hull negated the effects of magnetic mines, and the vessels towed minesweeping gear behind them. However, vessels had no equipment for actually handling mines aboard ship.

Am total of forty vessels were completed. The TR-40 minesweeper slowly replaced the K-8s in Soviet service, but the vessels were transferred to foreign navies such as Poland, Cuba and Vietnam. Designated Project 361T, a handful of K-8 boats were converted to mine warfare drones but saw limited service. The survivors were put into reserve until being struck from the record in the early 1980s.

References

Bibliography

Cold War minesweepers of Poland
Cold War minesweepers of the Soviet Union
Minesweepers of the Cuban Navy
Minesweepers of the Polish Navy
Minesweepers of the Soviet Navy
Minesweepers of the Russian Navy
Minesweepers of the Vietnam People's Navy